Leigh Desmond (born 1988) is an Irish hurler who plays for club side Youghal, divisional side Imokilly and at inter-county level with the Cork senior hurling team.

Honours

Youghal
Cork Premier Intermediate Hurling Championship (1): 2011

References

1988 births
Living people
Youghal hurlers
CIT hurlers
Imokilly hurlers
Cork inter-county hurlers